Beecraigs is a country park in West Lothian, approximately  south of the town of Linlithgow and  north-east of Bathgate and is a 4 star Visitor Attraction (Visitscotland). In 2010 prehistoric remains were uncovered on the site of the current visitor centre. To the west of the country park is privately owned Cockleroy Hill, which is topped by the remains of a prehistoric hillfort.

Location
A major attraction of Beecraigs is its location high on the hills above the towns of Bathgate and Linlithgow which afford impressive views of the surrounding countryside, including the Forth Valley, Linlithgow Loch, Binny Craig and Palace, the three Forth Bridges and the Pentland Hills.

Reservoir
The reservoir, now known as Beecraigs Loch, was built by German Prisoners of War. They were based in a work camp and had been sent from Stobs Camp near Hawick.  Clay and stone was used to build the dam wall, this stone was quarried from Riccarton Hill and brought down the slopes to the site using a winch-powered railway. By 1918 the 8 hectare reservoir, holding 82 million gallons of water, began serving as a local water supply and continued to do so for 55 years.

References

External links
 Beecraigs Country park website
 Beecraigs Prehistoric Site, West Lothian Archaeology Group

Parks in West Lothian
Country parks in Scotland